In military terms, 97th Division or 97th Infantry Division may refer to:

 97th Jäger Division (Wehrmacht)
 97th Guards Rifle Division (Soviet Union)
 U.S. 97th Infantry Division